KHDK (97.3 FM "Hot 97.3") is a Top 40 (CHR) radio station based in Burlington, Iowa, United States. It is owned by the Pritchard Broadcasting Corporation.

Before KHDK

Before CHR made its 2006 debut in the Burlington-Fort Madison area on 97.3, the station was known as KKNL (K K New London). KKNL was actually a simulcast of 93.5 KKMI to provide a better signal to Mount Pleasant, as the 93.5 signal is hard to receive in the Mount Pleasant Area. The simulcast lasted for four years, until late-2005 when KKNL broke away from KKMI, emerging as the Tri-States New Hit Music Channel: Hot 97 dot 3.

Syndicated shows
Hot 97.3 syndicates numerous radio shows.  "The Kidd Kraddick Morning Show" is the stations flagship syndicated show.  On the weekends they also syndicate "Rick Dees Weekly Top 40", "Hollywood Hamilton Weekend Top 30", and "The Hollywood 5".

On-air staff
The station airs The Kid Kraddick Morning show weekday mornings followed by Johnny B (10a-3p) Savanna (3pm-7pm) and Mikey J (7pm-mid)

External links
Hot 97.3 Website
Pritchard Broadcasting Website

HDK
Radio stations established in 2001
Contemporary hit radio stations in the United States
2001 establishments in Iowa